The Philippine Basketball Association (PBA) Order of Merit is an annual Philippine Basketball Association (PBA) award given since the 2008–09 PBA season to the player who had the most "Best Player of the Week" awards in a season. Unlike the traditional player awards, which is given by the league, this citation is awarded by the PBA Press Corps.

Winners

Multiple time winners

References

Order of Merit
Awards established in 2009
2009 establishments in the Philippines